The Berlin Contemporary Jazz Orchestra is a large German jazz ensemble led by Alexander von Schlippenbach. The orchestra performs orchestral jazz and experimental big band music and has included in its ranks such leading musicians as Misha Mengelberg and Kenny Wheeler. The orchestra, which performs rather infrequently, was founded in 1988 by Schlippenbach and has commissioned works by Carla Bley, Manfred Schoof, and Willem Breuker, among others.

Founding members
 Marc Stutz Boukouya
 Axel Dörner
 Gerd Dudek
 Bruno Leicht
 Walter Gauchel
 Dan Gottshall
 Thomas Heberer
 Jörg Huke
 Nobuyuki Ino
 Paul Lovens
 Henry Lowther
 Rudi Mahall
 Evan Parker
 Aki Takase
 Alexander von Schlippenbach
 Felix Wahnschaffe
 Utz Zimmermann

Discography
Berlin Contemporary Jazz Orchestra (ECM, 1990)
The Morlocks and Other Pieces (FMP, 1994)
Live in Japan '96 (DIW, 1998) with Aki Takase

References

See also
List of experimental big bands

Experimental big bands
German jazz ensembles
Big bands